Oyoun Qalbi (also romanized as Oyoun Albi) is Najwa Karam's tenth studio album. It was released in 2000.

Track listing
1. Khams Nmjoum (Five Stars)
2. Majboura (I'm Forced)
3. Ismak Besharifni (It's an honour to carry your name)
4. Oyoun Qalbi (Sweetheart)
5. Wallhana (Passionatley in Love)
6. Qalby Min Jowa (From the bottom of my Heart)
7. Khaleek al Ard (Stay Down to Earth)
8. Najwa 2000
9. Majboura (Instrumental)

Najwa Karam albums
2000 albums
Rotana Records albums